UFC Fight Night: Namajunas vs. VanZant (also known as UFC Fight Night 80) was a mixed martial arts event held on December 10, 2015, at The Chelsea at The Cosmopolitan in Las Vegas, Nevada.

Background
The event was expected to be headlined by a women's strawweight bout between Paige VanZant and Joanne Calderwood. However on October 28, Calderwood was forced to pull out of the event and was replaced by Rose Namajunas. 

The event was the first that the promotion has hosted at the venue and the first of three events in as many days in the Las Vegas Valley. It also marked the first North American card to air live exclusively on their subscription-based digital network, UFC Fight Pass.

A welterweight bout between Sheldon Westcott and Edgar García, originally scheduled for this event was moved to UFC 195.

Lyman Good was expected to face Omari Akhmedov at the event. However, Good was pulled from the bout in late October and was replaced by Sérgio Moraes.

Michael Graves was expected to face Danny Roberts at the event. However, Graves pulled out of the bout on November 30 citing an injury and was replaced by Nathan Coy.

Results

Bonus Awards
The following fighters were awarded $50,000 bonuses:
Fight of the Night: Jim Miller vs. Michael Chiesa
Performance of the Night: Rose Namajunas and Tim Means

Reported payout
The following is the reported payout to the fighters as reported to the Nevada State Athletic Commission. It does not include sponsor money and also does not include the UFC's traditional "fight night" bonuses.

 Rose Namajunas: $54,000 (includes $27,000 win bonus) def. Paige VanZant: $40,000
 Michael Chiesa: $60,000 (includes $30,000 win bonus) def. Jim Miller: $56,000
 Sage Northcutt: $80,000 (includes $40,000 win bonus) def. Cody Pfister: $12,000
 Thiago Santos: $38,000 (includes $19,000 win bonus) def. Elias Theodorou: $20,000
 Tim Means: $54,000 (includes $27,000 win bonus) def. John Howard: $27,000
 Sérgio Moraes: $28,000 (includes $14,000 win bonus) def. Omari Akhmedov: $14,000
 Kevin Casey: $28,000 (includes $14,000 win bonus) vs. Antônio Carlos Júnior: $19,000 ^
 Aljamain Sterling: $28,000 (includes $14,000 win bonus) def. Johnny Eduardo: $14,000
 Santiago Ponzinibbio: $26,000 (includes $13,000 win bonus) def. Andreas Ståhl: $10,000
 Danny Roberts: $20,000 (includes $10,000 win bonus) def. Nathan Coy: $10,000
 Zubaira Tukhugov: $24,000 (includes $12,000 win bonus) def. Phillipe Nover: $14,000
 Kailin Curran: $20,000 (includes $10,000 win bonus) def. Emily Kagan: $10,000

^ Both fighters earned show money (Casey awarded win Bonus); bout declared No Contest.

See also
List of UFC events
2015 in UFC

References

UFC Fight Night
Mixed martial arts in Las Vegas
2015 in mixed martial arts
December 2015 sports events in the United States